Kuya is a rural locality (a village) in Talazhskoye Rural Settlement of Primorsky District, Arkhangelsk Oblast, Russia. The population is 3 as of 2010.

Geography 
It is located 50 km north from Arkhangelsk.

References 

Rural localities in Primorsky District, Arkhangelsk Oblast